Château de Carentan was a castle in Carentan, Manche, France.

A castle has existed at Carentan since the 11th century. The castle was besieged by Jean de Vienne in July 1375, with English garrison surrendering. King Henry IV of France gave orders to destroy the fortifications and the castle in 1595.

References
René Le Tenneur. Carentan à travers les siec̀les: histoire d'une petite ville normande
Études et documents d'histoire de Basse-Normandie. Éditions O.C.E.P., 1970.

Châteaux in Manche